The Deninu Kųę́ First Nation is a Dene First Nations band government in the Northwest Territories. The band is headquartered in the community of Fort Resolution.

The Deninu Kųę́ First Nation belongs to the Akaitcho Territory Government and are signatories to Treaty 8.

References

First Nations in the Northwest Territories
Dene governments